Lander University is a public university in Greenwood, South Carolina.

Campus and housing

Lander University is located approximately one half-mile from uptown Greenwood, South Carolina. The main campus sits on 190 acres of land, though this does not include its many off-campus locations.

Lander University has ten residence halls. Residence halls include Bearcat Village, Brookside, Centennial Hall, Chipley Hall, Lide Apartments, McGhee Court, New Hall, Thomason, University Place, and Williamston.

In July 2021, Lander announced that the state legislature has appropriated new funding for the University, which includes money that will be used to construct a nursing building on Lander's campus in Greenwood.

Rankings
In the 2018 edition of U.S. News & World Reports Best Colleges rankings, Lander ranked 29 in Regional Colleges of the South and 6 in Best Colleges for Veterans.

Faculty
Lander has 178 full-time faculty members.

Academics
More than 90 areas of undergraduate and graduate studies are offered.
 College of Arts and Humanities 
 Department of Art + Design
 Department of English and Foreign Languages
 Department of Media and Communication
 Department of Music
 College of Behavioral and Social Sciences 
 Department of Government, Criminology, and Sociology
 Department of History and philosophy
 Department of Psychological Sciences and Human Services
 College of Business
 College of Education 
 Department of Teacher Education
 Department of Physical Education and Exercise Studies
 College of Science and Mathematics 
 Department of Biology
 Department of Physical Sciences
 Department of Mathematics and Computing
College of Graduate & Online Studies
Department of Graduate Studies
Department of Online Studies
William Preston Turner School of Nursing
Honors College

Athletics 

Varsity athletic teams have reaped honors at district and national levels, including 12 national championships in men's tennis, and, most recently, in men's wrestling. A member of the NCAA Division II, Lander plays in the Peach Belt Conference and fields teams in men's and women's basketball, soccer and tennis; men's baseball and golf; and women's cross country, softball and volleyball. Lander also offers club sports that include equestrian, ultimate disc, rugby, bass-fishing, lacrosse, soccer, water skiing, running, Cross-Fit, baseball, women's volleyball and it has an intramural program open to all students, faculty, and staff.

Greek life
Sorority and Fraternity organizations are under three different councils being the National Pan-Hellenic Council (NPHC), National Panhellenic Council (NPC), and Interfraternity Council (IFC)

NPC
Phi Mu
Zeta Tau Alpha (Lander founding 1986)
Gamma Phi Beta (Lander founding 1996)

NPHC
Alpha Kappa Alpha
Delta Sigma Theta
Sigma Gamma Rho
Zeta Phi Beta

IFC
Delta Sigma Phi (Lander founding 2016)
Alpha Tau Omega (Lander founding 2020)

History

Lander University was founded as a college for women by Methodist clergyman Samuel Lander in 1872 as Williamston Female College in Williamston, South Carolina. It was re-named Lander College in 1904.  Men were admitted in starting in 1943 and it became a university in 1992.

Lander University has had twelve presidents serve since its founding. They are: Samuel Lander (1872–1904); John O. Willson (1904–1923); B. Rhett Turnipseed (1923–1927); R. H. Bennett (1927–1932); John W. Speake (1932–1941); John Marvin Rast (1941–1948); Boyce M. Grier (1948–1966); E. Don Herd, Jr. (1966–1973); Larry A. Jackson (1973–1992); William C. Moran (1992–2000); Daniel W. Ball (2000–2015); and Richard E. Cosentino (2015–present).

See also
 List of colleges and universities in South Carolina
 List of current and historical women's universities and colleges

References

External links
Official website
Official athletics website

 
Educational institutions established in 1872
Public universities and colleges in South Carolina
Universities and colleges accredited by the Southern Association of Colleges and Schools
Methodism in South Carolina
Buildings and structures in Greenwood, South Carolina
1872 establishments in South Carolina